Jope Tuikabe (born 27 November 1966) is a Fijian former rugby union and rugby sevens player. He played as a flanker.

He has played for Fiji sevens since 1996. One year later, he was called up for the 1997 Rugby World Cup Sevens, which the Fijians won. He was elected as a star of tournament's team. Following the tournament, Post Fiji issued a series of stamps commemorating the winning team, which also included  Waisale Serevi, Taniela Qauqau, Leveni Duvuduvukula,  Inoke Maraiwai, Aminiasi Naituyaga, Lemeki Koroi, Marika Vunibaka, Luke Erenavula and  Manasa Bari. However, the Fijians did not manage to defend their title at the 2001 Rugby World Cup Sevens, as they were eliminated in the semi-finals of the main tournament after losing to Australia. Overall, Tuikabe scored nine tries in both of these tournaments. He appeared twice in the Commonwealth Games: in Kuala Lumpur 1998 and Manchester 2002, winning a silver medal in both tournaments after their final defeats against New Zealand. He, however won the rugby sevens tournament at the 2001 World Games. He also took part at the IRB Sevens World Series during the 1999/2000, 2000/2001 and 2001/2002 seasons. During three years of appearances in the rugby union squad, he played in 20 matches, including 17 official international matches, scoring 15 points - all tries. In 2001, thanks to his performances in both squads, he was awarded the Player of the Year Award. He was a soldier by profession and trained the Army rugby sevens team, and at international level he was in the coaching staff as assistant coach or head coach.

References

External links
Jope Tuikabe international statistics at ESPN Scrum
Jope Tuikabe at itsrugby.co.uk

1966 births
Fijian rugby union players
Living people
Rugby union flankers
Fiji international rugby union players
I-Taukei Fijian people
Fijian rugby sevens players
Commonwealth Games silver medallists for Fiji
Rugby sevens players at the 1998 Commonwealth Games
Rugby sevens players at the 2002 Commonwealth Games
Commonwealth Games medallists in rugby sevens
Medallists at the 1998 Commonwealth Games
Medallists at the 2002 Commonwealth Games